The R64 is a provincial route in South Africa that connects Kimberley with Bloemfontein via Boshof and Dealesville. It is slightly longer than the newer N8 route via Petrusburg, by about 10 kilometres.

Route
The R64 begins at an interchange with the N1 and the N8 national routes in Bloemfontein (Capital of the Free State), just west of the city centre. It begins by going north-west for 31 kilometres to cross the Modder River adjacent to the Krugersdrift Dam and Soetdoring Nature Reserve. It continues north-west for another 30 kilometres, exiting the Mangaung Metropolitan Municipality, to meet the western terminus of the R703 Road and enter the town of Dealesville.

In Dealesville Central, it turns west at the Brand Street junction and goes for 18 kilometres to meet the south-western terminus of the R59 Road. It proceeds westwards for 36 kilometres to enter the town of Boshof.

From Boshof, the R64 goes west-south-west for 52 kilometres to cross into the Northern Cape and enter the city of Kimberley (Capital of the Northern Cape). It makes a left turn at the Hull Street junction and proceeds to end at an intersection with the N12 and N8 national routes in the Kimberley City Centre.

References

External links
 Routes Travel Info

64
64
Provincial routes in South Africa